Eliphalet S. Stone (April 10, 1825 – December 8, 1905) was an American shipmaster, farmer, and politician.

Stone was born in Sodus Point, New York. He went to the public schools. In 1840, he began to sail on Lake Ontario. In 1842, he moved to Milwaukee, Wisconsin Territory. He was a master of a sailing vessel and owned a farm in Summit, Wisconsin, Waukesha County, Wisconsin. Stone served on the Summit Town Board and on the Waukesha County Board of Supervisors. In 1872, Stone served in the Wisconsin Assembly and was a Republican. He died at his home on Silver Lake in Waukesha County, Wisconsin.

Notes

1825 births
1905 deaths
People from Sodus, New York
People from Summit, Waukesha County, Wisconsin
Farmers from Wisconsin
Sea captains
County supervisors in Wisconsin
Wisconsin city council members
Republican Party members of the Wisconsin State Assembly
People from Waukesha County, Wisconsin
19th-century American politicians